Herbert Giersch (11 May 1921 – 22 July 2010) was a German economist. He was one of the initial members of the German Council of Economic Experts in 1964, serving on the council until 1970, and also was president of the Kiel Institute for the World Economy 1969–1989. Giersch was considered the most influential German economist during the chancellorships of Willy Brandt, Helmut Schmidt, and Helmut Kohl.

Born in Reichenbach, Silesia, Giersch attended the University of Breslau and the University of Kiel between 1939 and 1942, until he was drafted to serve in World War II. Returning from war captivity, he earned his Ph.D. in economics from the University of Münster in 1948. Giersch received a full professorship at the Saarland University in 1955. In 1969, he succeeded  at the University of Kiel, and held that chair until 1989.

Originally adherent to Keynesian economics in the 1950s and 1960s, he gradually became an advocate of supply-side economics in his later years.

See also
 Eurosclerosis

References

1921 births
2010 deaths
German economists
University of Breslau alumni
University of Kiel alumni
People from Dzierżoniów
People from the Province of Silesia
German military personnel of World War II
Grand Crosses with Star and Sash of the Order of Merit of the Federal Republic of Germany
Recipients of the Pour le Mérite (civil class)
Honorary Fellows of the London School of Economics
Member of the Mont Pelerin Society